Rowena (pronounced "roh-WEE'-nuh") is an unincorporated community and a census-designated place (CDP) in Minnehaha County, South Dakota, United States. The population of the CDP was 68 at the 2020 census. It is located along South Dakota Highway 42.

The ZIP Code is 57056.

Television towers
Two of South Dakota's tallest structures are located near Rowena: the 1,999 ft (609.2 meters) high KDLT Tower, and the slightly shorter KELO TV Tower.

History
The community has the name of Rowena, a character in the novel Ivanhoe. The city was founded by the Illinois Central Railroad when it was extended to that point.

Notable person

 Mamie Van Doren, actress and singer

References

Unincorporated communities in South Dakota
Unincorporated communities in Minnehaha County, South Dakota
Sioux Falls, South Dakota metropolitan area